The Independence of Brazil comprised a series of political and military events that led to the independence of the Kingdom of Brazil from the United Kingdom of Portugal, Brazil and the Algarves as the Brazilian Empire. Most of the events occurred in Bahia, Rio de Janeiro, and São Paulo between 1821–1824.

It is celebrated on 7 September, although there is a controversy whether the real independence happened after the Siege of Salvador on 2 July 1823 in Salvador, Bahia where the independence war was fought. However, September 7 is the anniversary of the date in 1822 that prince regent Dom Pedro declared Brazil's independence from his royal family in Portugal and the former United Kingdom of Portugal, Brazil and Algarves. Formal recognition came with a treaty three years later, signed by the new Empire of Brazil and the Kingdom of Portugal in late 1825.

Background

The land now called Brazil was claimed by the Kingdom of Portugal in April 1500, on the arrival of the Portuguese naval fleet commanded by Pedro Álvares Cabral. The Portuguese encountered Indigenous nations divided into several tribes, most of whom shared the same Tupi–Guarani languages family, and shared and disputed the territory. But the Portuguese, like the Spanish in their North American territories, had brought diseases with them against which many Indians were helpless due to lack of immunity. Measles, smallpox, tuberculosis, and influenza killed tens of thousands.

Though the first settlement was founded in 1532, colonization only effectively started in 1534 when King John III divided the territory into fifteen hereditary captaincies. This arrangement proved problematic, however, and in 1549 the king assigned a Governor-General to administer the entire colony. The Portuguese assimilated some of the native tribes while others slowly disappeared in long wars or by European diseases to which they had no immunity.

By the mid-16th century, sugar had become Brazil's main export due to the increasing international demand. To profit from the situation, by 1700 over 963,000 African slaves had been brought across the Atlantic Ocean to work in the plantations of Brazil. More Africans were brought to Brazil up until that date than to all the other places in the Americas (and the entire Western Hemisphere) combined.

Through wars against the French, the Portuguese slowly expanded their territory to the southeast, taking Rio de Janeiro in 1567, and to the northwest, taking São Luís in 1615. They sent military expeditions to the northwest of the South American continent to the Amazon River basin rainforest and conquered competing English and Dutch strongholds, founding villages and forts from 1669. In 1680 they reached the far southeast and founded Colônia do Sacramento on the bank of the Río de la Plata, in the Banda Oriental region (present-day Uruguay).

At the end of the 17th century, sugar exports started to decline, but beginning in the 1690s, the discovery of gold by explorers in the region that would later be called Minas Gerais, current Mato Grosso and Goiás saved the colony from imminent collapse. From all over Brazil, as well as from Portugal, thousands of immigrants came to the mines in an early gold rush.

The Spanish tried to prevent Portuguese expansion northwest, west, southwest and southeast into the territory that belonged to them according to the 1494 Treaty of Tordesillas division of the New World by the Bishop and Pope of Rome, Alexander VI (1431-1503, reigned 1492-1503) and succeeded in conquering the Banda Oriental region in 1777. However, this was in vain as the Treaty of San Ildefonso, signed in the same year, confirmed Portuguese sovereignty over all lands proceeding from its territorial expansion, thus creating most of the current Brazilian southeastern border.

During the French invasion of Portugal by Emperor Napoleon I in 1807, the Portuguese royal family (House of Braganza) fled across the Atlantic Ocean with the help of the British Royal Navy to Brazil, establishing Rio de Janeiro as the de facto capital of the Portuguese Empire during the ensuing worldwide Napoleonic Wars (1803–1815). This had the side effect of soon creating within Brazil many of the institutions required to exist as an independent state; most importantly, it freed Brazil to trade with other nations at will.

After Napoleon's Imperial French army was finally defeated at Waterloo in June 1815, in order to maintain the capital in Brazil and allay Brazilian fears of being returned to colonial status, King John VI of Portugal raised the de jure status of Brazil to an equal kingdom and integral part of the new United Kingdom of Portugal, Brazil and the Algarves, rather than a mere colony, a status which it enjoyed for the next seven years, sending his son, Dom Pedro, as prince regent.

Path to independence

Portuguese Cortes

In 1820 the Constitutionalist Revolution erupted in Portugal. The movement initiated by the liberal constitutionalists resulted in the meeting of the Cortes (or Constituent Assembly), that would have to create the kingdom's first constitution. The Cortes at the same time demanded the return of King Dom John VI, who had been living in Brazil since 1808, who elevated Brazil to a kingdom as part of the United Kingdom of Portugal, Brazil and the Algarves in 1815 and who nominated his son and heir prince Dom Pedro as regent, to govern Brazil in his place on 7 March 1821. The king left for Europe on 26 April, while Dom Pedro remained in Brazil governing it with the aid of the ministers of the Kingdom (Interior) and Foreign Affairs, of War, of Navy and of Finance.

The Portuguese military officers headquartered in Brazil were completely sympathetic to the Constitutionalist movement in Portugal. The main leader of the Portuguese officers, General Jorge de Avilez Zuzarte de Sousa Tavares, forced the prince to dismiss and banish from the country the ministers of Kingdom and Finance. Both were loyal allies of Pedro, who had become a pawn in the hands of the military. The humiliation suffered by the prince, who swore he would never yield to the pressure of the military again, would have a decisive influence on his abdication ten years later. Meanwhile, on 30 September 1821, the Cortes approved a decree that subordinated the governments of the Brazilian provinces directly to Portugal. Prince Pedro became for all purposes only the governor of Rio de Janeiro Province. Other decrees that came after ordered his return to Europe and also extinguished the judicial courts created by João VI in 1808.

Dissatisfaction over the Cortes measures among most residents in Brazil (both Brazilian-born and Portuguese-born) rose to a point that it soon became publicly known. Two groups that opposed the Cortes''' actions to gradually undermine Brazilian sovereignty appeared: Liberals, led by Joaquim Gonçalves Ledo (with the support of the Freemasons), and the Bonifacians, led by José Bonifácio de Andrada. The factions, with quite different views of what Brazil could and should be, agreed only on their desire to keep Brazil co-equal with Portugal, united in a sovereign monarchy, rather than Brazil being merely provinces controlled from Lisbon.

Avilez rebellion

The Portuguese members of the Cortes showed no respect towards Prince Pedro and openly mocked him. And so the loyalty that Pedro had shown towards the Cortes gradually shifted to the Brazilian cause. His wife, princess Maria Leopoldina of Austria, favoured the Brazilian side and encouraged him to remain in the country which the Liberals and Bonifacians openly called for. Pedro's reply to the Cortes came on 9 January 1822, when, according to newspapers, he said: "As it is for the good of all and for the nation's general happiness, I am ready: Tell the people that I will stay".

After Pedro's decision to defy the Cortes and remain in Brazil, around 2,000 men led by Jorge Avilez rioted before concentrating on mount Castelo, which was soon surrounded by 10,000 armed Brazilians, led by the Royal Police Guard. Dom Pedro then "dismissed" the Portuguese commanding general and ordered him to remove his soldiers across the bay to Niterói, where they would await transport to Portugal.

Jose Bonifácio was nominated minister of Kingdom and Foreign Affairs on 18 January 1822. Bonifácio soon established a fatherlike relationship with Pedro, who began to consider the experienced statesman his greatest ally. Gonçalves Ledo and the Liberals tried to minimize the close relationship between Bonifácio and Pedro, offering to the prince the title of Perpetual Defender of Brazil.Armitage. p. 61 For the Liberals, the creation of a Constituent Assembly to prepare a Brazilian constitution was necessary, while the Bonifacians preferred that Pedro create the constitution himself, to avoid the possibility of anarchy similar to the first years of the French Revolution.

The prince acquiesced to the Liberals’ desires, and signed a decree on 3 June 1822 calling for the election of deputies that would gather in a Constituent and Legislative General Assembly in Brazil.Lustosa, p. 145

From United Kingdom under Portugal to independent empire

Pedro departed to São Paulo Province to secure the province's loyalty to the Brazilian cause. He reached its capital on 25 August and remained there until 5 September. While on his way back to Rio de Janeiro on 7 September he received at Ipiranga mail from José Bonifácio and his wife, Leopoldina. The letter told him that the Cortes had annulled all acts of the Bonifácio cabinet, removed Pedro's remaining powers, and ordered him to return to Portugal.  It was clear that independence was the only option left, which his wife supported. Pedro turned to his companions, that included his Guard of Honor, and said: "Friends, the Portuguese Cortes want to enslave and pursue us. From today on our relations are broken. No ties can unite us anymore". He removed his blue-white armband that symbolized Portugal: "Armbands off, soldiers. Hail to the independence, to freedom and to the separation of Brazil from Portugal!" He unsheathed his sword affirming that "For my blood, my honor, my God, I swear to give Brazil freedom," and later cried out: "Brazilians, Independence or death!". This event is known as the "Cry of Ipiranga", the declaration of Brazil's independence,

Returning to the city of São Paulo on the night of 7 September 1822, Pedro and his companions announced the news of Brazilian independence from Portugal. The Prince was received with great popular celebration and was called not only "King of Brazil", but also "Emperor of Brazil".Lima (1997), p. 398

Pedro returned to Rio de Janeiro on 14 September and in the following days the Liberals had distributed pamphlets (written by Joaquim Gonçalves Ledo) that suggested that the Prince should be named Constitutional Emperor. On 17 September the President of the Municipal Chamber of Rio de Janeiro, José Clemente Pereira, sent to the other Chambers of the country the news that the Acclamation would occur on the anniversary birthday? of Pedro on 12 October.

The official separation would only occur on 22 September 1822 in a letter written by Pedro to João VI. In it, Pedro still calls himself Prince Regent and his father is considered the King of the independent Brazil.Vianna, p. 413 On 12 October 1822, in the Field of Santana (later known as Field of the Acclamation) Prince Pedro was acclaimed Dom Pedro I, Constitutional Emperor and Perpetual Defender of Brazil. It was at the same time the beginning of Pedro's reign and also of the Empire of Brazil. However, the Emperor made it clear that although he accepted the emperorship, if João VI returned to Brazil he would step down from the throne in favor of his father.

The reason for the imperial title was that the title of king would symbolically mean a continuation of the Portuguese dynastic tradition and perhaps of the feared absolutism, while the title of emperor derived from popular acclamation as in Ancient Rome or at least reigning through popular sanction as in the case of Napoleon.Barman (1999), p. 4; "Some weeks later he was acclaimed emperor as Pedro I of Brazil. In the terminology of the period, the word 'empire' signifying a monarchy of unusually large size and resources (as in the case of Russia), and this designation avoided D. Pedro's usurping the title of 'king' from his father, João VI." On 1 December 1822, Pedro I was crowned and consecrated.

International recognition
According to the Brazilian government and researcher Rodrigo Wiese Randig, the first country to recognize Brazil was the United Provinces of the Río de la Plata (today's Argentina), in June 1823, followed by the United States in May 1824, and the Kingdom of Benin in July 1824. However, according to historian Toby Green, the African states of Dahomey and Onim were the first two to recognize the new empire in 1822 and 1823 respectively. These states had traditionally maintained close diplomatic and economic contacts with South America.

War of Independence

Upon the declaration of the independence, the authority of the new regime only extended to Rio de Janeiro, São Paulo and the adjacent provinces. The rest of Brazil remained firmly under the control of Portuguese juntas and garrisons.  It would take a war to put the whole of Brazil under Pedro's control. The fighting began with skirmishes between rival militias in 1822 and lasted until January 1824, when the last Portuguese garrisons and naval units surrendered or left the country.

Meanwhile, the Imperial government had to create a regular Army and Navy.  Forced enlistment was widespread, extending to foreign immigrants, and Brazil made use of slaves in militias, as well as freeing slaves to enlist them in army and navy. The campaigns on land and sea covered the vast territories of Bahia, Cisplatina, Grão-Pará, Maranhão, Pernambuco, Ceará and Piauí.

By 1822, Brazilian forces were firmly in control of Rio de Janeiro and the central area of Brazil.  Loyal militias began insurrections in the aforementioned territories, but strong, and regularly reinforced Portuguese garrisons in the port cities of  Salvador, Montevideo, São Luís and Belém continued to dominate the adjacent areas and to pose the threat of a reconquest that the irregular Brazilian militias and guerrilla forces, which were loosely besieging them by land supported by newly created units of the Brazilian army, would be unable to prevent.

For the Brazilians, the answer to this stalemate was to seize control of the sea.  Eleven former Portuguese warships, great and small, had fallen into Brazilian hands in Rio de Janeiro and these formed the basis of a new navy. The problem was manpower: the crews of these ships were largely Portuguese who were openly mutinous, and although many Portuguese naval officers had declared allegiance to Brazil their loyalty could not be relied on.  The Brazilian Government solved the problem by recruiting 50 officers and 500 seamen in secret in London and Liverpool, many of them veterans of the Napoleonic Wars, and appointed Thomas Cochrane as commander-in-chief.
On 1 April 1823, a Brazilian squadron of 6 ships sailed for Bahia.  After an initial disappointing engagement with a superior Portuguese fleet, Cochrane blockaded Salvador.  Deprived now of supplies and reinforcements by sea and besieged by the Brazilian army on land, on 2 July the Portuguese forces abandoned Bahia in a convoy of 90 ships.  Leaving the frigate ‘Niteroi’ under Captain John Taylor to harry them to the coasts of Europe, Cochrane then sailed north to São Luís (Maranhão).  There he tricked the Portuguese garrison into evacuating Maranhão by pretending that a huge Brazilian fleet and army were over the  horizon.  He then sent Captain John Pascoe Grenfell to play the same trick on the Portuguese in Belém do Pará at the mouth of the Amazon.  By November 1823, the whole of the north of Brazil was under Brazilian control, and the following month, the demoralized Portuguese also evacuated Montevideo and the Cisplatine Province.  By 1824, Brazil was free of all enemy troops and was de facto independent.

There are still today no reliable statistics related to the numbers of, for example, the total of the war casualties. However, based upon historical registration and contemporary reports of some battles of this war as well as upon the admitted numbers in similar fights that happened in these times around the globe, and considering how long the Brazilian independence war lasted (22 months), estimates of all killed in action on both sides are placed from around 5,700 to 6,200.

In Pernambuco
 Siege of Recife

In Piauí and Maranhão
 Battle of Jenipapo
 Siege of Caxias

In Grão-Pará
 Siege of Belém

In Bahia
 Battle of Pirajá
 Battle of Itaparica
 Battle of 4 May
 Siege of Salvador

In Cisplatina
 Siege of Montevideo (1823)

Peace treaty and aftermath
The last Portuguese soldiers left Brazil in 1824.  The Treaty of Rio de Janeiro recognizing Brazil's independence was signed by Brazil and Portugal on 29 August 1825.

The Brazilian aristocracy had its wish: Brazil made a transition to independence with comparatively little disruption and bloodshed. But this meant that independent Brazil retained its colonial social structure: monarchy, slavery, large landed estates, monoculture, an inefficient agricultural system, a highly stratified society, and a free population that was 90 percent illiterate.

See also

 Empire of Brazil
 Colonial Brazil
 Cry of Ipiranga
 History of Brazil
 Treaty of Rio de Janeiro (1825)
 Independence Day (Brazil)

Further reading
 Gomes, Laurentino, 1822Footnotes

References

 Armitage, John. História do Brasil. Belo Horizonte: Itatiaia, 1981. 
 Barman, Roderick J. Citizen Emperor: Pedro II and the Making of Brazil, 1825–1891. Stanford: Stanford University Press, 1999. 
 Diégues, Fernando. A revolução brasílica. Rio de Janeiro: Objetiva, 2004. 
 Dolhnikoff, Miriam. Pacto imperial: origens do federalismo no Brasil do século XIX. São Paulo: Globo, 2005. 
 
 Gomes, Laurentino. 1822. Nova Fronteira, 2010.  
 Holanda, Sérgio Buarque de. O Brasil Monárquico: o processo de emancipação. 4. ed. São Paulo: Difusão Européia do Livro, 1976. 
 Lima, Manuel de Oliveira. O movimento da independência. 6. ed. Rio de Janeiro: Topbooks, 1997. 
 Lustosa, Isabel. D. Pedro I. São Paulo: Companhia das Letras, 2007. 
 Vainfas, Ronaldo. Dicionário do Brasil Imperial. Rio de Janeiro: Objetiva, 2002. 
 Vianna, Hélio. História do Brasil: período colonial, monarquia e república''. 15. ed. São Paulo: Melhoramentos, 1994.

External links

1820s conflicts
Empire of Brazil
Military history of Brazil
Latin American wars of independence
1822 in Brazil
Separatism in Brazil
Separatism in Portugal
Brazil–Portugal relations
1822 in international relations
Pedro I of Brazil

it:Impero del Brasile#Indipendenza brasiliana